Terramare, terramara, or terremare is a technology complex mainly of the central Po valley, in Emilia, Northern Italy, dating to the Middle and Late Bronze Age c. 1700–1150 BC. It takes its name from the "black earth" residue of settlement mounds. Terramare is from terra marna, "marl-earth", where marl is a lacustrine deposit. It may be any color but in agricultural lands it is most typically black, giving rise to the "black earth" identification of it. The population of the terramare sites is called the terramaricoli. The sites were excavated exhaustively in 1860–1910.

These sites prior to the second half of the 19th century were commonly believed to have been used for Gallic and Roman sepulchral rites. They were called terramare and marnier by the farmers of the region, who mined the soil for fertilizer. Scientific study began with Bartolomeo Gastaldi in 1860. He was investigating peat bogs and old lake sites in north Italy but did some investigations of the marnier, recognizing them finally as habitation, not funerary, sites similar to the pile dwellings further north.

His studies attracted the attention of Pellegrino Strobel and his 18-year-old assistant, Luigi Pigorini. In 1862 they wrote a piece concerning the Castione di Marchesi in Parma, a Terramare site. They were the first to perceive that the settlements were prehistoric. Starting from Gaetano Chierici's theory that the pile dwellings further north represented an ancestral Roman population, Pigorini developed a theory of Indo-European settlement of Italy from the north.

Settlements

The Terramare, in spite of local differences, is of typical form; each settlement is trapezoidal, with streets arranged in a quadrangular pattern. Some houses are built upon piles even though the village is entirely on dry land and some are not. There is currently no commonly accepted explanation for the piles. The whole is protected by an earthwork strengthened on the inside by buttresses, and encircled by a wide moat supplied with running water. In all over 60 villages are known, almost entirely from Emilia. In the Middle Bronze Age they are no larger than  placed at an average density of 1 per .

The remains discovered may be briefly summarized. Stone objects are few. Of bronze (the chief material) axes, daggers, swords, razors, and knives are found, as also minor implements, such as sickles, needles, pins, brooches, etc. Also remarkable is the finding of a large number of stone moulds, needed to obtain the bronze objects. There are also objects of bone and wood, besides pottery (both coarse and fine), amber, and glass paste. Small clay figures, chiefly of animals (though human figures are found at Castellazzo), are interesting as being practically the earliest specimens of plastic art found in Italy.

Society

The occupations of the Terramare people as compared with their Neolithic predecessors may be inferred with comparative certainty. They remained hunters, but also had domesticated animals; they were fairly skilful metallurgists, casting bronze in moulds of stone and clay; they were also agriculturists, cultivating beans, grapes, wheat, and flax.

According to William Ridgeway the dead were given a burial: further investigation, however, of the cemeteries shows that both burial and cremation were practiced, with cremated remains placed in ossuaries; practically no objects were found in the urns. Cremation may have been a later introduction.

Development and collapse

For the early phases of the Middle Bronze Age it is plausible to think of the Terramare in terms of a polycentric settlement system, with apparently no substantial differences between one village and another. The density of dwellings rose, and in the MB2 (1550–1450 BC) is worthy of note. There are areas, coinciding with those that have been most extensively investigated, in which the inhabited settlements in this phase are no more than 2 kilometres one from the other. It can therefore be supposed that the entire territory was occupied by a tight-knit network of villages, a polycentric system with settlements generally covering between 1 and 2 hectares and occupied by up to 250/260 inhabitants (about 125 per hectare). At that point, the dimension of the settlements began to vary. Until the MB2, their size did not normally exceed two hectares, but during the MB3 (1450–1350 BC), there was a substantial increase in the surface area occupied by certain of these settlements, while others remained limited in size or disappeared altogether. This tendency was consolidated in the LBA. Several of these settlements cover an area of up to 20 hectares. The size of the embankments and ditches can reach remarkable proportions, some exceeding 30 metres in width. For the more advanced phase of the Middle Bronze Age, and above all during the Late Bronze Age (1350–1150 BC), we can hypothesise a greater degree of diversified territorial organisation, including centres which are larger and tending towards hegemony, adjacent to smaller sites. In certain areas during the LBA, we see a higher frequency of sites occupying a larger extension and a scant presence of small-size settlements, perhaps due to a marked tendency towards concentration of population. This trend seems to be accentuated during the advanced LBA, when the overall number of settlements decreases, with a tendency towards concentration in larger-size settlements and probable subordination of the smaller settlements to the larger ones.

Around 1200 BC a serious crisis began for the Terramare culture that within a few years led to the abandonment of all the settlements; the reasons for this crisis, roughly contemporaneous with the Late Bronze Age collapse in the eastern Mediterranean, are still not entirely clear.  It seems possible that in the face of an incipient overpopulation (between 150,000 and 200,000 individuals were calculated) and depletion of natural resources, a series of drought periods led to a deep economic crisis, famine, and consequently the disruption of the political order, which caused the collapse of society. Around 1150 BC the Terramare were completely abandoned, with no settlements replacing them. The plains, especially in the area of Emilia, were abandoned for several centuries, and only in the Roman era they regain the density of population reached during the Terramare period.

It has been suggested that the memory of the fate of the Terramare culture may have lasted for centuries, until it was recorded by Dionysius of Halicarnassus, in his first book on the Roman Antiquities, as the fate of the Pelasgians. In his record the Pelasgians occupied the Po Valley up to two generations before the Trojan War, but were forced, by a series of famines of which they could not understand the reason, nor to which find a solution, to leave their once-fertile land and move to the south, where they merged with the Aborigines.

Theories of ethnic identity
Significant differences of opinion have arisen as to the origin and ethnographic relations of the Terramare population.

Edoardo Brizio, in his Epoca preistorica (1898), advanced a theory that the Terramare population had been the original Ligurians. Brizio believed that the Ligures, at some early point, took to erecting pile dwellings, although why they should have abandoned their previously unprotected hut-settlements for elaborate fortifications is unclear. While Brizio did not envision invading peoples until long after the Terramare period, the pile dwellings, ramparts and moats at Terramare sites have usually seemed more akin to military defenses, than the prevention of inundation during regular flooding; for instance, Terramare buildings usually stood on hills. There are other difficulties of a similar character with Brizio's theory.

Luigi Pigorini (1842–1925) proposed that a population derived from the Terramare culture was a dominant component of the Proto-Villanovan culture—especially in its northern and Campanian phases and the Terramare culture has been an Indo-European-speaking population, the ancestors of the Italici, i.e. the Italic-speaking peoples. Pigorini also attributed to the Italici a tradition of lake dwellings, modified in Italy into Terramare-style pile dwelling on dry land.
 
More recently, Italian archeologist Andrea Cardarelli has proposed re-evaluations of contemporaneous Greek accounts, such as that of Dionysius of Halicarnassus, and to link the Terramare culture to the Pelasgians whom the Greeks generally equated with the Tyrrhenians and specifically, therefore, the Etruscans.

List of sites
Santa Rosa di Poviglio, in Poviglio - see Terramare of Santa Rosa
Fondo Paviani, in Legnago - see Centro ambientale archeologico di Legnago
Case del Lago
Case Cocconi, in Parma
Anzola dell'Emilia

Gallery

See also
Genetic history of Italy
Prehistoric Italy
Villanovan culture
Polada culture
Ancient peoples of Italy
Dark earth

References

Sources

Further reading
 See specifically pp. 721–726.

Archaeological cultures of Southern Europe
Chalcolithic cultures of Europe
Bronze Age cultures of Europe
Archaeological cultures in Italy
Prehistoric Italy
Italic archaeological cultures
Pelasgians